Xenodermus javanicus, also known as the dragon snake, Javan tubercle snake, Javan mudsnake, or rough-backed litter snake, is a small non-venomous, semi-fossorial snake species belonging to the monotypic genus Xenodermus. This species is best known for their characteristic dorsal scales and interesting defense mechanism in which they stiffen their entire bodies when threatened. X. javanicus is nocturnal and subsists on a diet of frogs, tadpoles and small fish. While they are known to perish once placed into captivity, some herpetoculturists have been successful in keeping them.

Distribution and habitat
Xenodermus javanicus is found in the Malay Peninsula (Malaysia, Thailand, and one old record from the southernmost tip of Myanmar) and parts of the Greater Sunda Islands (Sumatra, Java, and Borneo, as well as some smaller islands).

Description
Xenodermus javanicus has a distinct head and long tail. The body is slender and compressed. Males can be distinguished from females by examining the overall size, tail thickness, tail length, and cloacal vent for the presence of a hemipenial bulge. Females will be larger than males and have thinner, shorter tails while lacking a hemipenial bulge. Conversely, males will be smaller in comparison, have thicker, longer tails and exhibit a hemipenial bulge.

Differentiation of sex chromosomes and karyotype characterization
Xenodermus javanicus has an unusual chromosomal number of 2n=32, contrasting with the most typical snake karyotype with a stable chromosomal number of 2n=36. The karyotype includes heteromorphic ZZ/ZW sex chromosomes with a heterochromatic W.

Behavior

Breeding
Xenodermus javanicus undergo reproduction by egg and have low fecundity (2–4 eggs).

Activity pattern
Xenodermus javanicus are nocturnal.

Diet
Xenodermus javanicus subsist mainly on frogs, tadpoles and small fish.

Behaviors
Xenodermus javanicus exhibit a peculiar property when encountering perceived threats in which they stiffen their entire body.

Conservation status
Xenodermus javanicus are rare in the northern parts of their range, but are common in Java. There seem to be no major threats to them, and they can persist in wet agricultural lands such as rice fields. They could be potentially threatened by agricultural pollutants.

References

Xenodermidae
Monotypic snake genera
Snakes of Southeast Asia
Reptiles of Brunei
Reptiles of Indonesia
Reptiles of Malaysia
Reptiles of Myanmar
Reptiles of Thailand
Taxa named by Johannes Theodor Reinhardt
Reptiles of Borneo